Tétrade of Lyon  ( or ) is the 11th bishop of Lyon. He replaces Maxime in the first half of the 4th century.

Like his predecessor Maximus, he is known from the various lists of the first archbishops of Lyon and chronicles the history of the Church of Lyon. It is sometimes confused with Tetrad, bishop of Bourges who lived two centuries later.

References 

Bishops of Lyon
4th-century bishops in Gaul
Year of birth unknown
Year of death missing